The third and final season of American Gods, based on Neil Gaiman's novel of the same name, was broadcast on Starz between January 10 and March 21, 2021, and consisted of ten episodes. Charles H. Eglee adapted the third season, serving as the showrunner after the departure of second-season showrunner Jesse Alexander and original series creators Bryan Fuller and Michael Green after the first season. The season was officially greenlit in March 2019 and production began in October 2019.

The season stars Ricky Whittle, Emily Browning, Yetide Badaki, Crispin Glover, Bruce Langley, Omid Abtahi, Demore Barnes and Ian McShane, who all return from the previous season, while Ashley Reyes joins the main cast.

The third season follows Shadow Moon as he moves to Lakeside, Wisconsin under a new name to hide from the New Gods.

Cast and characters

Main
 Ricky Whittle as Shadow Moon / Mike Ainsel, a former convict who became Mr. Wednesday's bodyguard, but left the job after discovering he is Wednesday's estranged son.
 Emily Browning as Laura Moon, Shadow Moon's wife and a revenant.
 Yetide Badaki as Bilquis, a goddess of love, identified with the Queen of Sheba.
 Bruce Langley as Technical Boy, a New God of Technology who in 1893 had been a failed inventor.
 Omid Abtahi as Salim, an emerging gay Muslim man from Oman who moved to the U.S. and fell in love with a djinn.
 Ashley Reyes as Cordelia, a rebellious and tech savvy college dropout who works for Mr. Wednesday as his protégée, driver, and technology assistant.
 Ian McShane as Mr. Wednesday, the war-mongering Norse god Odin incarnated as a con artist.
 Demore Barnes as Mr. Ibis, the keeper of stories past and present, scribe to Old Gods. Egyptian god Thoth.
 Crispin Glover as Mr. World, the New God of globalization and the vicious leader of the New Gods.

Recurring
 Eric Johnson as Chad Mulligan, Lakeside's Chief of Police.
 Lela Loren as Marguerite Olsen, a local reporter in Lakeside who takes an interest in Shadow.
 Julia Sweeney as Ann-Marie Hinzelmann, the owner of a small convenience store and the unofficial self-appointed mayor of Lakeside.
 Marilyn Manson as Johan Wengren, the lead singer of the Viking death metal band Blood Death and a berserker.
 Blythe Danner as Demeter, the Greek goddess of the harvest who has an unresolved romantic history with Mr. Wednesday, who now goes by the name Caroline Wells.
 Herizen Guardiola as Oshun, the Yoruban goddess of love, purity, and fertility.
 Dominique Jackson as Ms. World, a second apparition of Mr. World.
 Denis O'Hare as Tyr, a former Norse god who in the past got his hand bitten off by the Fenrir, and who now is a dentist.
 Danny Trejo as a third apparition of Mr. World.
 Peter Stormare as Czernobog, Slavic god of darkness, death, and malevolence.
 Iwan Rheon as Liam Doyle, a charming, good-natured leprechaun.

Guests
 Devery Jacobs as Sam Black Crow, a half-Cherokee hitchhiking college student.
 Wale as Chango, an Orisha who has a link to Shadow's past.
 Graham Greene as Whiskey Jack, a Manitou who despises Mr. Wednesday.
 Daniel Jun as Tu Er Shen, a Chinese god who blesses a motel for giving him shelter.

Episodes

Production

Development
The series was renewed for a third season by Starz on March 15, 2019, and it was confirmed that Charles H. Eglee would serve as showrunner for the third season replacing Jesse Alexander. The season consisted of ten episodes, Alongside Eglee, the season is executive produced by Neil Gaiman, Anne Kenney, Damian Kindler, David Paul Francis, Mark Tinker, Ian McShane, Craig Cegielski, and Stefanie Berk. In March 2021, after the season had finished airing, Starz announced it had canceled the series.

Filming
The season was scheduled to film between September 20, 2019, and March 6, 2020. Production began in October 2019 in Toronto.

Casting
The third season features several new actors in recurring roles. In September 2019, Marilyn Manson and Blythe Danner were cast in recurring roles. In October, Ashley Reyes joined as a series regular, while Herizen Guardiola, Lela Loren, Dominique Jackson, and Eric Johnson joined in recurring roles. In November, Danny Trejo, Julia Sweeney, and Wale joined the guest cast; while in December, Iwan Rheon was added to the cast. It was reported that Crispin Glover would return in a guest role.

The third season also sees several cast changes, including the departure of Pablo Schreiber as Mad Sweeney at the end of the previous season. In December 2019, Orlando Jones stated that he had been fired from the series in September and alleged that new showrunner Charles Eglee decided his character, Mr. Nancy, sends "the wrong message for black America". In response, a spokesperson for the series stated that Jones' contract was not renewed because his character Mr. Nancy is not included in the book material on which the season 3 episodes are based. Also in December, Mousa Kraish announced that he would also not appear in the third season.

On February 1, 2021, Manson was removed from the cast following abuse allegations against him. Manson's scenes from his final episode, "Sister Rising", were removed.

Release
The third season of American Gods premiered in the United States on January 10, 2021, with weekly international distribution beginning from January 11 via Amazon Prime.

Reception

Critical response
The third season received positive reviews from critics, who called it an improvement over its predecessor. Rotten Tomatoes, it has a 79% rating with an average score of 6.90 out of 10 based on 19 reviews, with the critical consensus stating, "Though it's unlikely to bring anyone back into the fold, American Gods tighter focus and strong performances may be enough for fans still holding out hope for a solid finish."

Ratings

References

External links
 
 

2021 American television seasons
American Gods (TV series)